A brass quintet is a five-piece musical ensemble composed of brass instruments. The instrumentation for a brass quintet typically includes two trumpets or cornets, one French horn, one trombone or euphonium/baritone horn, and one tuba or bass trombone. Musicians in a brass quintet may often play multiple instruments. Trumpet players for instance may double on piccolo trumpets and flugelhorns. There can be variation in instrumentation depending on the type of quintet. In some quintets, the horn is replaced by an additional trombone. Euphonium may also be substituted for the trombone part. While the tuba is considered a standard, the range and style of many pieces lend themselves to being played with bass trombone as the lowest-pitched instrument. Additionally, some pieces call for the use of percussion instruments, particularly the snare drum, tambourine, or timpani.

History 
The earliest brass chamber music was written in the mid to late 1800s and coincided with the invention of brass instruments that could play chromatically. The Distin family formed one of the first brass quintets in 1833, touring Europe and the United States to promote a new family of brass instruments called saxhorns. French composer Jean-François Bellon and Russian composer Victor Ewald, led the development of brass chamber music in Paris and Russia during this period. Bellon published the first series of twelve brass quintets in 1850 while Ewald composed his quintets between the years 1888 and 1912 all while improvements were being made to brass instruments. The improvement of brass instruments played a big role later on in the history of brass quintets as it allowed the player to do more with the instrument which in turn allowed for more artistry.  

The modern brass quintet has only been around for six decades as prior to World War II, there were only a select number of pieces written for brass quintet. The brass quintet is believed to have not been established as a formal chamber ensemble until 1947. This is known as there had to have been compositions for brass chamber, as well as the existence of amateur and professional groups.The instrumentation for brass ensembles would have also needed to “remain constant for a sustained period of time before 1947.” Prior to 1947, many composers began composing for the modern day brass quintet instrumentation that was later established by the New York Brass Quintet.

Brass quintets in the United States of America 

The contemporary brass quintet appeared in the early 1950s with the New York Brass Quintet, followed in the 1960s by the American Brass Quintet, Chicago Brass Quintet, and Eastman Brass Quintet. Robert Nagel can be credited with forming the first serious brass quintet in the United States, the New York Brass Quintet in 1954, and it was this ensemble that commissioned and premiered the first major brass quintet pieces in the repertoire like the Malcolm Arnold, Gunther Schuller and Alvin Etler brass quintets. Although the New York Brass Quintet did play pieces such as the Malcolm Arnold etc., much of their repertoire consisted of transcriptions of music from the Renaissance and Baroque. The Annapolis Brass Quintet was the first brass quintet in the United States to have its members perform with the group full-time. The group frequently performed throughout North America, Europe, and Asia from its founding in 1971 until the group disbanded in 1993.  However, it was with the founding of Canadian Brass in 1970 that the brass quintet became a popular entertainment attraction in the chamber music world. Canadian Brass established both the style and popularity of the quintet medium throughout the world, having performed more than five thousand concerts, selling more than 500,000 quintet music books, and creating a library of over 600 compositions and arrangements for brass quintet. They continue to be one of the most popular and recognizable contemporary brass quintets. The brass quintet has accrued a sizable amount of literature for an ensemble that was only firmly established halfway through the 20th century. Notable contributions to the literature include many commissions by modern ensembles such as the American Brass Quintet and transcriptions by other ensembles such as the Canadian Brass. More specifically, Dr. Arthur Frackenpohl wrote many arrangements and transcriptions for the Canadian Brass for over 20 years and played a pivotal role in producing repertoire not only for the Canadian Brass but for all Brass Quintets.

International Brass Quintet Festival 
In 1980 the International Brass Quintet Festival and Symposium was established and at the time, was the only one to exist. This festival, similar to many of the festivals we see for Orchestra or Band, featured music forums, masterclasses, competitions, in-residence programs and free concerts. This festival was held between 1980 through 1992 at the Village of Cross Keys in Baltimore, Maryland. During this time many world-renowned brass quintets made appearances including the Budapest Brass Quintet, Le Concert Arban from Paris, Ensemble Prisma from Vienna,  and the Theo Martens Brass Quintet. In 1989 history was made as the Berlin Brass Quintet from East Berlin shared the stage with the Brandenburg Quintet from West Berlin before the Berlin Wall had officially fallen.

Examples of notable brass quintets 

 American Brass Quintet
 Annapolis Brass Quintet
 Atlantic Brass Quintet
 Canadian Brass
 Chestnut Brass Company
 Chicago Brass Quintet
 Dallas Brass
 Empire Brass
 Meridian Arts Ensemble
 New York Brass Quintet
 Presidio Brass
 Smoky Mountain Brass Quintet

See also
 Brass quintet repertoire

References

 
Types of musical groups